The 1927 Tulane Green Wave football team represented Tulane University as a member of the Southern Conference (SoCon) during the 1927 college football season. Led by first-year head coach Bernie Bierman, the Green Wave played their home games at Tulane Stadium in New Orleans. Tulane finished the season with an overall record of 2–5–1 and an identical mark in conference play.

Schedule

References

Tulane
Tulane Green Wave football seasons
Tulane Green Wave football